The 1650 Programme of six 510 ton Fourth Rate vessels was initiated by the Council of State on 16 November 1649. On 2 January 1650 the Admiralty Committee confirmed that six 'frigrates' had been ordered at a cost of 6.10.0d per ton. The ships would be built under contract with the exception of one ship built in Dockyard. The ships were all named by 16 August 1650 and launched by the end of the year. Each ship was to carry initially 34 guns and 150 men. This would increase over time

Design and specifications
The construction one  vessels was assigned to Deptford dockyard with the remainder contracted to private builders. The contract dimensional data was keel of  breadth  and a builder's measure tonnage of  tons at a contract price of 6.10.0d per ton. The ships were to have 34 guns and a manning level of 150, however, this was increased to 40 and 44 guns with 180 personnel. The guns would be culverins on the lower deck (LD), demi-culverines on the upper deck and sakers on the quarterdeck (QD).

Ships of the 1650 Programme Group

Notes

Citations

References
 British Warships in the Age of Sail (1603 – 1714), by Rif Winfield, published by Seaforth Publishing, England © Rif Winfield 2009, EPUB , Chapter 4, The Fourth Rates - 'Small Ships', Vessels acquired from 24 March 1603, 1650 Programme
 Ships of the Royal Navy, by J.J. Colledge, revised and updated by Lt-Cdr Ben Warlow and Steve Bush, published by Seaforth Publishing, Barnsley, Great Britain, © the estate of J.J. Colledge, Ben Warlow and Steve Bush 2020, EPUB 
 The Arming and Fitting of English Ships of War 1600 - 1815, by Brian Lavery, published by US Naval Institute Press © Brian Lavery 1989, Part V Guns, Type of Guns

 

Frigates of the Royal Navy
Ships of the Royal Navy